New Happy Dad and Son 2: The Instant Genius is a 2016 Chinese animated family comedy film directed by He Cheng. It was released in China on August 19, 2016.

Plot

Cast

Reception
The film has grossed  at the Chinese box office.

References

2016 animated films
2016 comedy films
2016 films
Animated comedy films
China Film Group Corporation films
Chinese animated films
Tianjin Maoyan Media films
Wuzhou Film Distribution films